"Cigarettes" is a song by American rapper and singer Juice Wrld. After being leaked for several years, it was released on February 2, 2022, by Grade A Productions and Interscope Records. The song was produced by Nick Mira. It was later added to Juice Wrld's fourth studio album Fighting Demons as a part of the extended edition.

Background
The song first leaked online in October 2018. It continuously garnered attention on the Internet over the next three years. On February 2, 2022, Juice Wrld's estate uploaded the song to streaming services, surprising fans. The single was released alongside an animated music video and another song from Juice Wrld, "Go Hard 2.0".

Composition
Over guitar-laden production, Juice Wrld sings about not wanting to be lonely and his feelings for his loved one, as well as his addiction to smoking.

Music video
The official music video was directed by Steve Cannon and released on March 3, 2022. It follows a young man named Derek (played by Logan Shroyer) whose addiction to alcohol leads to him losing his job as a warehouse worker and the end of his relationship with his girlfriend. The man begins a journey of being sober for 999 days (a reference to the number which Juice Wrld is associated with) and achieves his goal. However, during a night out with his friends (one of whom is played by actor Angus Cloud), Derek goes to the bar and orders a drink, tempted to drink again. He flips his sobriety coin to decide. After it lands, his ex-girlfriend stops him and they happily walk away, rekindling their relationship.

Charts

Release history

References

2022 singles
2022 songs
Juice Wrld songs
Songs written by Juice Wrld
Interscope Records singles
Songs written by Nick Mira